Teresa Colom i Pich (born 12 December 1973) is an Andorran author and poet.

Biography
Maria Teresa Colom i Pich was born in La Seu d'Urgell in 1973. She initially studied economics, graduating from Pompeu Fabra University and went to work in a career in finance. Colom won a number of awards for her writing and left work to write full time. Colom won the Miquel Martí i Pol prize in 2000 and the Maria Àngels Anglada prize in 2016. She is considered one of the most important poets in Andorra. Her works have been translated into a number of languages including Spanish, French and Italian. Since 2022 is the Director of Fundació Ramon Llull.

Works 
 Com mesos de juny, Edicions del Diari d'Andorra, 2001
 La temperatura d'uns llavis, Edicions del Diari d'Andorra, 2002 
 Elegies del final conegut, Abadia Editors, 2005 
 On tot és vidre, Pagès Editors, 2009 
 La meva mare es preguntava per la mort, Pagès Editors, 2012
 La senyoreta Keaton i altres besties Empúries La Huerta Grande, 2015
Consciència, Empúries, 2019

References

 

1973 births
Living people
People from La Seu d'Urgell
Andorran writers